Gelora 99 Stadium is a stadium located in Pada Village, Nubatukan District, Lembata Regency, East Nusa Tenggara, Indonesia. This stadium is a homebase to Liga 3 team Persebata Lembata.

History
Gelora 99 Stadium began construction in 2018. Apart from being the homebase of Persebata Lembata, this stadium is also used as an office for youth and sports affairs. Initially the Gelora 99 Stadium was built to prepare Lembata Regency to host the Soeratin Cup.

The name Gelora 99 Stadium was assigned by the former Regent of Lembata Eliaser Yentji Sunur. The philosophy behind the name Gelora 99, according to Yentji Sunur, is that the number 99 refers to 1999 when Lembata was established as an administrative regency, separated from East Flores Regency.

Description
Gelora 99 Stadium is located in Pada Village, Nubatukan District, about 2 Km west of Lewoleba District, the capital city of Lembata Regency.

Gelora 99 Stadium  has one main grandstand capacity 3,000 peoples, the changing rooms and the main grass field are equipped with a drainage system.

References

Multi-purpose stadiums in Indonesia
Buildings and structures in East Nusa Tenggara
Football venues in Indonesia
Sports venues in Indonesia
2018 establishments in Indonesia
Lembata Regency